Sainte-Hélène-de-Chester is a municipality located in the Centre-du-Québec region of Quebec, Canada.

It was formerly a township municipality named Chester-Est, but it changed its name and its status on May 3, 2008.

The old Sainte-Hélène-de-Chester and Trottier Mill were two former small towns within this municipality.

Sources
(Google Maps)

References

Municipalities in Quebec
Incorporated places in Centre-du-Québec